The Bizarre Stories of Professor Zarbi (original French-language title: Les Histoires bizarres du professeur Zarbi) is a Canadian adult supernatural animated comedy. It premiered in French on Télétoon's Télétoon la nuit block on September 5, 2019. An English version of the series debuted on January 15, 2021 on Adult Swim in Canada.

Created by Michel Beaudet and Salambo Productions, the series follows an eccentric professor and his sidekick neighbour as they confront paranormal activities across Quebec. Each episode is designed around tropes common to horror fiction, many times offering direct homages to specific films.

Production
The series was officially announced by Télétoon on May 16, 2018. It was created by Michel Beaudet and Salambo Productions, who previously worked on Knuckleheads for the network on its spinoff. Unlike their prior work which combined multiple mediums, Zarbi is an entirely animated production, utilizing Toon Boom Harmony. Télétoon greenlit the series in favour of another season of 2 Nuts and a Richard!. The first 10 episodes of an initial 20 episode order began airing in French Canada on September 5, 2019.

Like Knuckleheads, Beaudet voices most of the characters in the French version of the series. In the English version, Zarbi is played by Terrence Scammell, with his assistant Benjamin voiced by Angela Galuppo.

References

External links
 

2019 Canadian television series debuts
2010s Canadian adult animated television series
2010s Canadian animated comedy television series
2020s Canadian adult animated television series
2020s Canadian animated comedy television series
Canadian adult animated comedy television series
English-language television shows
Teletoon original programming
Television series by Corus Entertainment